Kjeller Airport is a military and general aviation airport located in Kjeller in Skedsmo in Viken county, Norway. The airport is owned by the Norwegian Defence Logistics Organization, while the civilian operations is carried out by Kjeller Aero Senter. The main military activity is the Aerospace Industrial Maintenance Norway, the main maintenance facility for the Royal Norwegian Air Force (RNoAF).

The airport became the first in Norway when it was established in September 1912 to serve the Norwegian Army Air Service. The break-out of World War I resulted in a major expansion of the air field, followed by military aircraft factory Kjeller Flyfabrikk moving to Kjeller in 1916. Gradual expansions took place in the following decades. The airport was occupied by the Luftwaffe on 10 April 1940, resulting in Junkers, Daimler-Benz, BMW and Brinker Eisenwerk establishing various maintenance facilities at the airport. After liberation in 1945, the RNoAF converted Kjeller to a maintenance base and placed the Air Force Logistics Command there from 1952. Runway expansions took place in 1951, 1959 and 1975.

History

Establishment
Kjeller Airport was the first airport established in Norway. The need for an airport for the Norwegian Army Air Service arose in September 1912, after the first four pilots had been trained and the two first aircraft, Maurice Farman Longhorns, were obtained. Two of the pilots went scouting around Lillestrøm on 8 September to find a suitable location for an air field, and settled on Kjeller after two days of reconnaissance. The area was selected because of its vicinity to the capital and its flat geography. The first aircraft, Ganger Rolf, was hauled to Kjeller by horse on 14 September, where it was assembled and flew for the first time on 21 September. Construction of a hangar was subcontracted to Strømmens Trævarefabrik on 13 September, and the structure was completed on 27 September. The first flight to another airport took place on 3 October, when a plan flew to Trondheim, piloted by Einar Sem-Jacobsen, the commander at Kjeller.

At first the airport was no more than a plot . The army rented space at Kjeller Farm, which was owned by M. H. Brøther and Minister of Foreign Affairs Nils Claus Ihlen. The farm had a telephone and provided office space and living spaces for the employees at the airport. The army thus hired a cook for the establishment. Aircraft would often land at various fields in Skedsmo as part of the training. The airport was gradually expanded and within a year of the opening measured . Polar explorer Roald Amundsen started his flight training in 1913 and took Norway's first civilian pilot's license on 11 June 1914. On 18 August 1913 two departments were established at Kjeller: a technical and a tactical. The former had the responsibility for introductory training and maintenance, while the latter had advanced training and flight operations. These two divisions remained until they were merged in 1917.

With the break-out of World War I in 1914 the airport became subject to a major expansion. In two years the airport was expanded from  rented land to  owned land, of which the airport itself. This took place by the state buying a lot on the other side of the creek of Sogna. Hence there were two areas of the airport, which both served as runways. The original was known as Skoleplassen, the newer as Granasletta, later as the "outer airport". At the time the border between the then independent municipalities of Skedsmo and Lillestrøm ran through the airport. The airport was organized such that it was supposed to cultivate spare areas on its land. The army expected that this was done such that it gave earnings, while keeping it suitable for flights.

The army established a pilot school on 1 July 1914, which initially accepted four regular students and one mechanic. By September both Longhorns had been wrecked and written off, stopping further training. By then only one pupil had completed the course. Training resumed after new aircraft were delivered in mid-1915. Hærens Flyvemaskinfabrikk, which had been established in 1914 in Sagene in Oslo, moved to Kjeller in May 1916, at the same time the airport was flooded. Four sheds were constructed for the factory.

Early years
From 1 July 1916 a one-year military pilot training school was established and one of the hangars was converted to a barracks. Four hundred people applied and twenty were selected for the first class. The first seventeen were certified in June 1917, using Maurice Farman Shorthorns, and organized as its own department. From 1919 the Kjeller-built FF 5 were taken into use. In addition to pilots, the school was responsible for training mechanics. Most years the school would carry out a major four-week exercise in February–March at a different location than the airport.

The Søndenfjeldske Air Wing was formally established in 1917, but did not become operative until 1919, when it had accumulated a combined twenty Farman F.40 and Royal Aircraft Factory B.E.2. A new barracks was completed in early 1918. On 31 May 1919 the a fire struck two of the hangars, burning to the ground. The insurance money was used to build two new hangars, which were completed in 1923. The school started using the Kjeller-built FF 9 trainer planes from 1922. By 1921 the army concluded that the quality of the aircraft being manufactured at Kjeller did not meet that of internationally produced machines. Hærens Flyvemaskinfabrikk therefore started license-production of aircraft from 1924.

The air wing carried out trial scheduled flights to Hamar and Fredrikstad during the summer of 1920, using the two-seat BE-2s. Eighty-four trips were flown, carrying thirty-five passengers and with five accidents. The air wings main exercise took place in July and August every year. It received Bristol F.2B Fighters in 1921, Hannover Cl.V in 1924 and Fokker C.V in 1928. The barracks was expanded in 1926 and again in 1930. Funding for a garrison at Kjeller was secured from 1933, allowing a permanent staff and the establishment of a full-time workshop.

The airport was struck by heavy flooding in 1916, 1927, 1931 and 1934. Because of the regular floods, the army decided to conduct drainage of the airport. Because the creek Sogna flowed between the two sections of the airport, it was desired to build a connection between the two. Sogna was placed in a  pipeline, allowing it to bypass the airport on its way to Nitelva. Construction started in 1929, but lack of funding delayed completion until 1934. From 1932 the school introduced license-built variants of the De Havilland Moth and Tiger Moth.

In 1933 there were various proposals to start commercial flights to Oslo. KLM investigated Kjeller as a possible site for the extension of their service to Copenhagen, but found that Kjeller Airport did not meet their standards. Although sowed with grass, the runway often could not withstand the landing forces of the aircraft. A trial was run with 5,000 tonnes and described as a success by the army, proposing that a spur from the Trunk Line be built to Kjeller for all of Oslo's  of garbage be disposed at the airport. However local residents complained about the stench and effectively halted the project.

Lufthansa started a service to Kjeller Airport during the summer of 1936 as a tentative solution while their seaplane was being overhauled. They there put a seventeen-passenger Junkers Ju 52 into the service to London, Copenhagen, Hamburg and Amsterdam. The service was especially popular with travelers to London, as they did not have to transfer at Copenhagen, and the route saw a typical ten to twelve passengers for each of the daily departures. Ground transport was carried out by motor coach, which used twenty-five minutes from Oslo. This was about the same as the ferry used to Gressholmen Airport. Regular services started on 1 June 1938 and lasted until 10 October. The following year the route was transferred to the newly opened Oslo Airport, Fornebu. Lufthansa also carried out a trial flight with a Focke-Wulf Fw 200 on 13 August 1938.

World War II
On the day before Operation Weserübung, which started the German occupation of Norway on 8 April 1940, warning was received by the airport commander, Harald Normann. The aircraft were evacuated from the airport and camouflaged. At the time the airport was covered in snow, forcing the aircraft to use skis. A large shipment of the airport's technical equipment had just been shipped to Sola Air Station, which was unsuccessfully attempted recalled. At two o'clock in the morning of 9 April the aircraft were commanded to fly to Steinsfjorden at sunrise. The first departed at 05:15.

By the time the Luftwaffe attack had set in at 7:55, seven aircraft had been evacuated and were used throughout the Norwegian Campaign. One person was killed when the Heinkel He 111 aircraft from Kampfgeschwader 4 bombed the airport to shatters. Because the battalion was the initial target, people who were at the aircraft factory had time to evacuate. The anti-aircraft guns fired 97 shots, but were unable to shoot down any aircraft, although unconfirmed hits were reported. After three hours of attack the airport lay in ruins. Minister of Defense Birger Ljungberg announced at 14:07 that Oslo, including Kjeller Airport, was regarded as lost and all units were ordered to cease fire. However, machine gun fire hit a German Ju 52 transport aircraft at 15:15.

To support the scrambling of men at Gardermoen Air Station and Trandum, it was important to delay a German offensive across Nitelva. Thus one hundred men from the airport were, against the orders of the minister, commanded to put up a defense along the river. The assignment was difficult as there was a large amount of private vehicles evacuating individuals from the capital. The official surrender of the airport and factory took place on 10 April at 08:30. Civilian employees were given a few weeks off before they were ordered to clean up the facilities. Military employees were eventually sent to their hometowns. The first German aircraft, a Ju 52, landed at Kjeller on 10 April at 12:30. After mounting skis it was able to depart three and a half hours later.

During the occupation the airport was under various military administration within the Luftwaffe. Initially the airport was covered in snow and thus not suitable for aviation. However, it was often used for accommodation for pilots, as the quarters at Fornebu was packed. The only aircraft stationed at the airport was a group of communication aircraft, at first designated Verbindungsstaffel 4, later Verbindungsstaffel Norwegen. This consisted of various aircraft, such as the Ju 52, the Fieseler Fi 156 Storch and Siebel Si 204D and were stationed from 10 May. After the snow disappeared the German forces started construction of a  wooden runway. The work also included a damn to protect the airport from flooding.

The main Axis use the airport was to serve as a forward mechanical center for Norway. The decision was largely based on existence of the aircraft factory. A new hall was built, which along with upgrades to the existing gave four halls. In addition a paint shop and large warehouse were built. New workshops had to be built for instruments, radio and electrical equipment. From the summer of 1940 the factory became a division of Junkers Flugzeug- und Motorenwerke. It relied largely on the existing Norwegian workforce, but was forced to extensive retraining because of the advanced construction of the German aircraft. Junkers eventually withdrew and was replaced by Brinker Eisenwerk. The operation kept going until 1944. There was also established two separate motor repair shops, one operated by Daimler-Benz and one operated by Bayerische Motorenwerke (BMW). Both received new concrete halls. The work at the various companies was often met with passive resistance, such as through slow work, demands for work to be redone and occasionally sabotage.

The first bombing of Kjeller by the Allies was planned for 16 November 1943, but canceled because of the cloudy weather. Two days later the Eighth Air Force of the United States Air Force carried out an attack on Kjeller, using 102 B-24 Liberators to deliver 838 high-explosive bombs. The civilian workforce was away from work as there was a German military exercise being carried out, under supervision of General Nikolaus von Falkenhorst. This caused the anti-aircraft guns to be loaded with blanks and that no-one suspected that it was a real attack until the bombs started raining. Russian prisoners of war were used to clear the undetonated shells. Both Daimler-Benz's workshop and one of the halls were destroyed, as were an estimated twelve aircraft and the rest of the buildings suffered significant damages. German reports concluded with few casualties, while Swedish reports estimate ca. 200.

In the Luftwaffe retaliation, six Liberators were shot down over Skagerrak and four escaped to Sweden. The raid crippled the maintenance: Daimler-Benz moved to Sandefjord, while BMW moved to Alnabru in Oslo. Brinker Eisenwerk remained and soon resumed operations. A new raid was therefore carried out on 20 April 1944 by No. 5 Group of the Royal Air Force, using 51 Avro Lancaster bombers. Twelve Norwegian were killed and the raid effectively stopped all maintenance activity at Kjeller until the end of the war. The airport was surrendered to Norway on 9 May 1945, after the end of the war.

Reconstruction

The airport had a capacity for 2,500 men at the end of the war, although the bombing and lack of subsequent repair had left the airport in a dilapidated state. The aircraft factory had been dismantled for most of its equipment. It was therefore converted to a pure maintenance facility which was to serve as the main workshop for the newly established Royal Norwegian Air Force (RNoAF). It was hence only to be kept airworthy to such a degree that aircraft could land for maintenance. The workshop's first major task was the renovation of seventeen Fieseler Storchs. The air force established its mechanical school at Kjeller in October 1945 as did the Air Force Communications and Radar School. As the space was limited the technical school was moved to Kjevik Air Station and the latter to Lutvann in February 1946.

The wooden runway caused massive maintenance costs and required the entire strip to be inspected daily for loose planks. By 1948 it was is so poor condition that the air force decided to replace it with a permanent surface. The ground consisted of clay and sand which frost heaving, requiring the upper layer of earthwork to be replaced. Because the German runway had required planes to approach close to Nittebergåsen, the runway was moved eight decrees counterclockwise to meet civilian aviation requirements from the International Civil Aviation Organization. Removal of the wooden runway started on 23 April 1949, and during this work it was discovered that the runway had been mined with dynamite. Drainage started on 10 May and leveling on 8 June. The strip was officially opened on 15 October.

This allowed a De Havilland Vampire to land and the maintenance division could start servicing jet aircraft. For a semester in 1950, Kjeller was used as a recruit and early pilot school for the air force. More than one hundred people were admitted and the training was the basis for sending them for full education in the United States. Kjeller Flyklubb was established as acivilian aero club in 1950, bought a plane and started pilot training at Kjeller. However, there was little cooperation from the military, who preferred that Kjeller not be used for civilian activities, limiting their activities.

With the order of new F-84 Thunderjets and F-86 Sabres, Kjeller Airport would need significantly longer runway to take down the fighter jets. The proposal received massive local protests, as it would force the runway to cut through Storgaten, the main road to Lillestrøm, and the Trunk Line, as well as significant areas around Åråsen, reaching all the way to Leira. The military rejected extending westwards, as a crossing of Nitelva would be prohibitively expensive. The debate would continue for several years, including proposals to close the airport.

As part of the establishment of the air force, a material division was established in 1952. Initially known as Kjeller Depot, it became the Air Force Logistics Command from 1 October. At the same time the aircraft factory officially ceased to exist and was merged to the Maintenance Group. However, without a longer runway, the Logistics Command was considered moved to Flesland Air Station or Værnes Air Station. Lillestrøm Municipal Council approved plans for a  runway on 2 May 1958. Although this would spare the main road, it would still have to be closed during take-off and landing of jets.

Construction started on 25 August and saw an upgrade to the existing runway through a  layer of crushed stone being laid on top of the concrete. The runway was extended by ca.  in each direction, and received a  layer of construction aggregate. The entire runway was asphalted, creating a  surface. The work was completed on 1 June 1959. During construction the airfield has been used for 115 aircraft movements.

Joint operations
The aero club, which changed its name to Nedre Romerike Flyklubb in 1959, was allowed to operate out of Kjeller Airport from 1964. The air force organized its maintenance such that service on seaplanes and helicopters was carried out at Karljohansvern in Horten. This changed in 1965, when also maintenance of helicopters was carried out by Kjeller. During the 1960s the Norwegian Army's direct support division for Project Nike was placed at Kjeller Airport.

The runway was further extended all the way to Storgaten between 2 and 29 April 1975, to create a  overrun. By 1981 the new F-16 Fighting Falcons needed their first overhauling at Kjeller. The runway was by then found unsuitable, as it has cracks and loose parts which could easily be sucked into the engines. During the summer two layers of asphalt were laid and the runway was extended  westwards all the way to Nitelva. The work was completed in time for the first F-16 to land on 1 September.

Operations
 Kjeller Aero Senter (KAS)
 Nedre Romerike Flyklubb (NRFK)
 Veteranflygruppen i NRFK (NRFV)
 Oslo Flyklubb (OFK)
 Kjeller Sportsflyklubb (KSK)
 Kjeller Flyhistoriske Forening (KFF)
 Kjeller Aerodrome Norway (KAN)
 Norwegian Spitfire Foundation (NSF)
 Warbirds of Norway (WoN)
 Visit Kjeller
 Aeromech
 HelikopterDrift
 Experimental Aircraft Association Chapter 573 Norway
 Aerospace Industrial Maintenance Norway – AIM Norway

Accidents and incidents
The accident was caused by a weak steel tube in the tailplane. The next accident occurred on 23 August near Tangen. The first passenger to be killed was a 17-year-old woman on 1 April 1919, when an Avro 504 spiraled down in an accident where the pilot was able to walk away nearly unhurt. Lethal accidents were frequent and by the break-out of the Second World War nineteen military pilots had been killed in accidents at or around the airport.

References

Bibliography

Further reading

External links

 Kjeller Aero Senter
 flydagen.no

Airports in Viken
Norwegian Army Air Service stations
Luftwaffe airports in Norway
Royal Norwegian Air Force airfields
Airports established in 1912
1912 establishments in Norway
Aerospace museums in Norway
Museums in Viken
Skedsmo
Military installations in Viken